Robin Mukherjee is a British screenwriter, author, and teacher. He has written for a number of high-profile television series, including The Bill, Casualty, EastEnders and Roman Mysteries. He has also written two feature films, one of which Lore, was critically acclaimed worldwide and won many international awards, including the Australian Writer's Guild Award for Best Adapted Screenplay. It was Australia's official entry for Best Foreign Language Film at the 2012 Oscars.

In 1996, he wrote a pilot episode for a new series of Poldark, The Stranger from the Sea, which became a controversial adaptation with fans, using a new cast featuring John Bowe as Ross Poldark and Mel Martin as Demelza. Fans protested, and over fifty members of the Poldark Appreciation Society picketed HTV's headquarters in Bristol wearing 18th century costumes. He was also set to write a three-part serial for the original series of Doctor Who, entitled Alixion, but the series was cancelled in 1989 before his scripts reached production.

In addition, Mukherjee has authored several radio dramas and written a screenwriting manual, The Art of Screenplays: A Writer's Guide in 2014, as part of the Creative Essentials series of books on filmmaking. He serves as Bath Spa University's Writer in Residence, as well as an MA Tutor & PhD Supervisor.

Writing credits

References

External links
 Official Website
 Robin Mukherjee at the Internet Movie Database

Living people
Academics of Bath Spa University
British Asian writers
British instructional writers
British soap opera writers
British television writers
English people of Indian descent
English children's writers
English screenwriters
English male screenwriters
English soap opera writers
English television writers
English dramatists and playwrights
English male dramatists and playwrights
Male television writers
Screenwriting instructors
Writers of books about writing fiction
Year of birth missing (living people)